Jennifer Lynn Hatmaker (née King; born 1974) is an American author, speaker, blogger, and television presenter.

She has been featured in Christianity Today magazine. She and her then-husband Brandon, joined by their five children, host the HGTV series Your Big Family Renovation. She has one New York Times bestselling book, For the Love.

Ministry 
Hatmaker and her then-husband, Brandon, founded Austin New Church located in Austin, Texas. She remains on the church's board. She was thought to be a successor to Houston evangelist Beth Moore who has been a mentor and a headliner in the Women of Faith tours. She headlines women's events, parenting and adoption conferences, and participates in a variety of social service ministries such as the Legacy Collective which has been active in Texas hurricane recovery.

LGBT advocacy 

In April 2016 Hatmaker called for the full inclusion of LGBT people into the Christian community. She reiterated her position in October 2016, and as a result, LifeWay Christian Resources decided to discontinue selling her publications.

Since the 2016 presidential election she alleges that she has been receiving death threats for making public statements critical of Donald Trump and challenging evangelical Christian attitudes towards LGBT people, and her family has been harassed by the community where she lives in Buda, Texas.

Personal life
In 1993, Hatmaker married Brandon Hatmaker. They have five children, two of whom were adopted. In September 2020, Hatmaker announced on her social media streams that she and Brandon were getting divorced, and described it as "completely unexpected".

Works

References

External links
 Personal website

1974 births
Living people
American Christian writers
American bloggers
American women television personalities
People from Buda, Texas
American women non-fiction writers
21st-century American non-fiction writers
American women bloggers
21st-century American women writers
Television personalities from Texas